John Watters (6 October 1924 – 2 August 2006) was an Australian cricketer. He played one first-class cricket match for Victoria in 1950.

See also
 List of Victoria first-class cricketers

References

External links
 

1924 births
2006 deaths
Australian cricketers
Victoria cricketers
Cricketers from Melbourne